The 1952–53 National Hurling League was the 22nd season of the National Hurling League.

Division 1

Tipperary came into the season as defending champions of the 1951-52 season.

On 19 April 1953, Cork won the title after a 2-10 to 2-7 win over Tipperary in the final. It was their 6th league title overall and their first since 1947-48.

Group A table

Group B table

Knock-out stage

Semi-finals

Final

References

National Hurling League seasons
League
League